The Vizyakha is a river in Perm Krai, Russia, a right tributary of the Veslyana, which in turn is a tributary of the Kama.

References 

Rivers of Perm Krai